NTV is a Turkish nationwide television news channel owned by Doğuş Media Group.

It was partnered with MSNBC between May 2000 and 2014. Besides domestic and international news, the channel's programming includes documentaries, as well as programs on finance, arts and culture, lifestyle, and sports.

History
NTV was founded in 1996 as a subsidiary of Cavit Çağlar's Nergis Group (hence the original full name of Nergis TV) and as the first news channel of Turkey. In January 1999, the channel became part of Doğuş Group. The success of NTV changed the Turkish media industry and started the era of thematic TV channels.

In June 2013, NTV's lack of coverage on the Gezi Park protests saw protests in front of its head office in Istanbul, and the resignation of some NTV staff in protest. The CEO of Doğuş Media Group, Cem Aydın, conceded that the criticisms were "fair to a large extent", and that "our audience feels like they were betrayed". Shortly after his comments, Aydın left Doğuş Media. Soon after that, NTV refused to air a BBC World News package on press freedom in Turkey, breaking its partnership agreement with the BBC. The BBC suspended the agreement in response.

NTV HD 
On 17 January 2016 the channel launched NTV HD, a high-definition simulcast of NTV.

References

External links

Official website
NTV at LyngSat

Television stations in Turkey
MSNBC
Turkish-language television stations
Television channels and stations established in 1996
Doğuş Group
24-hour television news channels in Turkey